Ian Neville Grey (6 April 1931 – 7 July 2009) was a New Zealand rugby league footballer who represented New Zealand in the 1954 World Cup.

Early life
Born in Auckland in 1931, Grey was the son of New Zealand rugby league representative Eric Grey and was a noted tennis player in his youth.

Playing career
Grey played in the Auckland Rugby League competition as a loose forward, first playing three games for Richmond in 1948 before moving to Point Chevalier between 1948 and 1956. He then captained Northern Districts in 1957 and was captain-coach in 1958. Northern Districts was a combination of North Shore and Northcote.

Grey represented Auckland from 1951 to 1958 and the North Island in 1954. He first played for the New Zealand national rugby league team at the 1954 World Cup, playing in one test at fullback. He also played two test matches on the 1955-1956 tour of Great Britain and France.

Coaching career
Grey coached Ponsonby to runners-up in the 1967 Auckland Rugby League championship before winning the competition in 1968. He also coached Auckland between 1967 and 1968.

Later years
Grey later moved to Australia and served as the Victorian Rugby League Chairman between 1988 and 1993. He died in Blairgowrie, Victoria, on 7 July 2009 after a short battle with cancer.

References

1931 births
2009 deaths
Auckland rugby league team coaches
Auckland rugby league team players
Deaths from cancer in Victoria (Australia)
New Zealand emigrants to Australia
New Zealand rugby league administrators
New Zealand rugby league coaches
New Zealand rugby league players
New Zealand national rugby league team players
Richmond Bulldogs players
Point Chevalier Pirates players
North Island rugby league team players
Ponsonby Ponies coaches
Rugby league locks
Rugby league players from Auckland